First National Bank Building, also known as the Lawyers Building, is a historic office building located at Gastonia, Gaston County, North Carolina.  It was designed by Wilson & Sompayrac and built in 1916–1917. It is a seven-story, rectangular, Classical Revival style steel frame building.  It is sheathed in cream-colored brick with limestone and terra cotta trim.

It was listed on the National Register of Historic Places in 1986. It is located in the Downtown Gastonia Historic District.

References

Office buildings on the National Register of Historic Places in North Carolina
Neoclassical architecture in North Carolina
Commercial buildings completed in 1917
Buildings and structures in Gaston County, North Carolina
National Register of Historic Places in Gaston County, North Carolina
Individually listed contributing properties to historic districts on the National Register in North Carolina